Des Moines is the capital of the state of Iowa in the United States.

Des Moines may also refer to:

Places
Des Moines metropolitan area, the metropolitan area for Des Moines, Iowa
Des Moines, Iowa
Des Moines River
Des Moines County, Iowa
Des Moines, Washington
Des Moines, New Mexico
Des Moines Township, Boone County, Iowa
Des Moines Township, Dallas County, Iowa
Des Moines Township, Jasper County, Iowa
Des Moines Township, Jefferson County, Iowa
Des Moines Township, Lee County, Iowa
Des Moines Township, Pocahontas County, Iowa
Des Moines Township, Polk County, Iowa
Des Moines Township, Van Buren County, Iowa
Des Moines Township, Jackson County, Minnesota

Other uses
Des Moines Building, listed on the National Register of Historic Places in Polk County, Iowa
Des Moines-class cruiser used by the US Navy
"Dez Moines", a song from the album With Roots Above and Branches Below by the American metalcore band The Devil Wears Prada.

See also 
 Lemoyne (disambiguation)